The Beijing Fengtai Stadium (Chinese: 丰台体育场) is a multi-purpose stadium in Fengtai District, Beijing, China. It is currently used mostly for football matches and also sometimes for athletics. The stadium was the home ground of Beijing Renhe in 2016-2019. The stadium holds 31,043. The Fengtai Stadium was not used for football during the 2008 Summer Olympics and also the 2022 Winter Olympics. The venue also served as home ground for Beijing Guoan, the third Chinese sports club with 5 million followers on Weibo after Guangzhou Evergrande and Shandong Luneng Taishan, between 2006 and 2008.
One of those games was against the world famous Spanish side FC Barcelona in August 2007.

References

Football venues in Beijing
Athletics (track and field) venues in China
Sports venues in Beijing
Multi-purpose stadiums in China
Venues of the 1990 Asian Games